The Voyager class refers to a design of post-Panamax cruise ships owned and operated by Royal Caribbean International. The Voyager-class ships were built at Kværner Masa-Yards Turku New Shipyard, Finland.

There are two generations of Voyager-class ship which feature slight differences in design. The first generation ships, Voyager of the Seas, Explorer of the Seas and Adventure of the Seas, were launched between 1999 and 2001. The second generation ships Navigator of the Seas and Mariner of the Seas were launched in 2002 and 2003 respectively.

History

The Voyager class was named Project Eagle prior to launch. The project begain in 1995 after a series of marketing studies. Eagle aimed to attract cruisers who did not consider themsleves "cruise ship people".

Voyager of the Seas was the first of Royal Caribbean's ships to feature a large open space in the centre of the ship known as the Royal Promenade, which has become a staple of future Royal Caribbean International ships, as well as being adopted by other cruise lines in various forms. The Royal Promenade was inspired by Harri Kulovaara, who was VP of Quality Assurance at RCI in the 1990s, who designed a similar feature on a Silja Lines ferry.

Design
Voyager-class ships have a diesel-electric powertrain. The generated electric power drives three 14 megawatt ABB Azipod azimuth thrusters (two steerable and one fixed).

The Voyager class featured some world firsts for cruise ships when it debuted, including the first rock climbing wall (mounted on the funnel) and ice-skating rink at sea.

The class' architecture was assigned to different architects and firms, some of which had no previous cruise ship experience. For example, the 1,350-seat La Scala Theatre on Voyager of the seas was designed by architect Wilson Butler Lodge, inspired by the Milan Opera House and bringing cruise-first features of Broadway theatres. This is the first time Royal Caribbean used theatre planning and design consultants for its onboard theatres.

First and second generations 
The first and second generations of the Voyager class differ slightly in design. Navigator of the Seas introduced wider glass balconies to the class. A number of public venues were changed, such as the retirement of the Aquarium Bar, Sports Bar and Island Grill and the introduction of Bolero's Bar, Vintages wine bar, Portofino, Chops Grille, Jade and the Plaza. The youth and teen areas were also reconfigured, the newer ships removing the children's pool area at the aft of the ship.

Modification history 
In 2012,  was modified to include an outdoor movie screen and new passenger lounges.

Ships

References

External links
 Royal Caribbean factsheet on the Voyager class

Ships built in Finland
Cruise ship classes
Royal Caribbean International